The cabinet of Tunisian Head of Government Habib Essid was approved on 5 February 2015 by a majority of 166 of total 217 legislators of Tunisia's Assembly of the Representatives of the People. The unity government consists of 27 ministers and 14 secretaries of state and includes independents, members of Nidaa Tounes, the two liberal parties Free Patriotic Union (UPL) and Afek Tounes, and a member of the Islamist Ennahda.

Essid's first proposal, a minority government of just Nidaa Tounes and the UPL, he had brought forward on 23 January, was retracted after facing enough resistance not to be approved by a parliamentary majority.

Cabinet members

References

Essid
Cabinets established in 2015
2015 in Tunisian politics
2015 establishments in Tunisia